The Tropaeum Traiani or Trajanic Trophy is a monument in Roman Civitas Tropaensium (site of modern Adamclisi, Romania), built in AD 109 in then Moesia Inferior, to commemorate Roman Emperor Trajan's victory over the Dacians, in the winter of 101–102, in the Battle of Adamclisi. Before Trajan's construction, an altar existed there, on the walls of which were inscribed the names of the 3,000 legionaries and auxilia (servicemen) who had died "fighting for the Republic". (Latin: Tropaeum from Greek: Tropaion, source of English: "trophy").

Compared to Trajan's Column in Rome, erected to celebrate the same victories and a "product of Roman metropolitan art", the sculpted metopes have been described as in "barbarian provincial taste", carved by "sculptors of provincial training, reveal[ing] a lack of experience in figurative representation, in organic structure and a naive idiom that remains detached from the classical current".

Trajan's monument was inspired by the Augustus mausoleum, and was dedicated to Mars Ultor in AD 107–108. On the monument there were 54 metopes depicting Roman legions fighting against enemies; most of these metopes are preserved in the museum nearby. The monument was supposed to be a warning to the tribes outside this newly conquered province.

By the 20th century, the monument was reduced to a mound of stone and mortar, with a large number of the original bas-reliefs scattered around. The present edifice is a reconstruction dating from 1977. The nearby museum contains many archaeological objects, including parts of the original Roman monument. Of the original 54 metopes, 48 are in the museum and 1 is in Istanbul.

Trophy

The monument was dedicated with a large inscription to Mars Ultor (the avenger). The inscription has been preserved fragmentarily from two sides of the trophy hexagon, and has been reconstructed as follows:
MARTI ULTOR[I]
IM[P(erator)CAES]AR DIVI
NERVA[E] F(ILIUS) N[E]RVA
TRA]IANUS [AUG(USTUS) GERM(ANICUS)]
DAC]I[CU]S PONT(IFEX) MAX(IMUS)
TRIB(UNICIA) POTEST(ATE) XIII
IMP(ERATOR) VI CO(N)S(UL) V P(ater) P(atriae)
?VICTO EXERC]ITU D[ACORUM]
?---- ET SARMATA]RUM
 ----]E 31.

The inscription, which calls Trajan Germanicus from his previous victories in Germany and Dacicus for his new conquest of Dacia, can be translated:
To Mars Ultor, 
Caesar the emperor, son of the divine Nerva, 
Nerva Trajan Augustus, Germanicus, 
Dacicus, Pontifex Maximus, 
Plebeian tribune for the 13th time, 
[proclaimed] Emperor [by the army] for the 6th time, 
Consul for the 5th time, Father of the Fatherland, 
Conquered the Dacian and Sarmatian armies ...

Metopes
On the monument was a frieze comprising 54 metopes. 48 metopes are hosted in the Adamclisi museum nearby, and one metope is hosted by Istanbul Archaeology Museum, the rest having been lost (There is a reference from  Giurescu that two of them fell into the Danube during the transport to Bucharest).

Roman General Tomb

Legionaries Memorial
"in honorem et in memoriam fortissimorum virorum qui pugnantes pro republica morte occubuerunt"

1977 Reconstruction
The monument was restored based on a hypothetical reconstruction in 1977.

Archeological research
In 1837, four Prussian officers, hired by the Ottoman Empire to study the Dobruja strategic situation, performed the first excavations. The team was composed by Heinrich Muhlbach, leading Friedrich Leopold Fischer, Carol Wincke-Olbendorf and Helmuth von Moltke the Elder. They tried to reach the center of the monument by digging a tunnel, nothing was found after the digging.

The monument was also visited by C. W. Wutzer from Bonn University, who recorded a short description of the monument and of some local legends.

The monument was researched by Grigore Tocilescu, O. Benford and G. Niemann, between 1882–1895, George Murnu in 1909, Vasile Parvan stop the researches in 1911, Paul Nicorescu studied the site between 1935–1945, Gheorghe Stefan and Ioan Barnea in 1945. From 1968 the site was researched under Romanian Academy supervision.

Civitas Tropaensium

References

Sources

Adolf Furtwängler: Das Tropaion von Adamklissi und provinzialrömische Kunst. (München, Verlag der K. Akademie, 1903) Das Tropaion von Adamklissi und provinzialromische Kunst: Furtwängler, Adolf, 1853-1907: Free Download, Borrow, and Streaming
Florea Bobu Florescu, Das Siegesdenkmal von Adamklissi. Tropaeum Traiani. Akademieverlag, Bukarest 1965.
Wilhelm Jänecke, Die ursprüngliche Gestalt des Tropaion von Adamklissi. Winter, Heidelberg 1919.
Adrian V. Rădulescu, Das Siegesdenkmal von Adamklissi. Konstanza 1972 und öfter.
Ian A. Richmond: Adamklissi, en Papers of the British School at Rome 35, 1967, pp. 29–39.
Lino Rossi, A Synoptic Outlook of Adamklissi Metopes and Trajan’s Column Frieze. Factual and Fanciful Topics Revisited, en Athenaeum 85, 1997, pp. 471–486.
Luca Bianchi, Il trofeo di Adamclisi nel quadro dell'arte di stato romana, in Rivista dell'Istituto Nazionale d Archeologia e Storia dell'Arte 61, 2011, pp. 9-61 Ahttp://arche-o.nolblog.hu/page/2/
Brian Turner. 2013. "War Losses and Worldview: Re-Viewing the Roman Funerary Altar at Adamclisi." American Journal of Philology 134.2:277-304. DOI: War Losses and Worldview: Re-Viewing the Roman Funerary Altar at Adamclisi.

External links

 The Museum Complex of Adamclisi

Dacia in art
Buildings and structures in Constanța County
Nerva–Antonine dynasty
2nd-century Roman sculptures
Victory monuments
Roman sites in Romania
Tourist attractions in Constanța County
Historic monuments in Constanța County